Crenicichla stocki is a species of cichlid native to South America. It is found in the Amazon River basin and in the Tocantins River basin.

The fish is named in honor of Ploeg’s promoter (Ph.D. supervisor) Jan H. Stock (1931–1997), a carcinologist with the Zoological Museum in Amsterdam, on the occasion of Stock's retirement in October 1990.

References

Ploeg, A., 1991. Revision of the South American cichlid genus Crenicichla Heckel, 1840, with description of fifteen new species and consideration on species groups, phylogeny and biogeography (Pisces, Perciformes, Cichlidae). Univ. Amsterdam, Netherlands,153 p. Ph.D. dissertation. 

stocki
Fish of the Amazon basin
Taxa named by Alex Ploeg
Fish described in 1991